Morten Poulsen (born 9 September 1988) is a Danish professional ice hockey forward who currently plays for Herning Blue Fox in the Danish Metal Ligaen (DEN).

Playing career
Poulsen was brought up in the Herning Blue Fox system before moving to Nordsjælland Cobras for the 2008–09 season. After two seasons with the North Zealand club, he returned to Herning before the 2010-11 season. Back with his hometown team, he enjoyed considerable success playing on a line with North American imports Bryan Marshall and Kevin Gardner. Poulsen finished runner-up in the regular season points race with 25 goals and 35 assists for a total of 60 points in 39 games. He won the Danish championship with Herning in 2007, 2008, and 2011.

He signed with IK Oskarshamn of the Swedish second-tier league, the HockeyAllsvenskan, before the 2011-12 season. After four years with Oskarshamn, Poulsen left as a free agent to sign a one-year contract with Austrian club, Graz 99ers of the EBEL on 8 July 2015.

In May 2016, he signed with the Pelicans Lahti of the Finnish Liiga. After one year, Poulsen left Finland coming back to EBEL, signing a one-year deal with HC TWK Innsbruck.

International play
Poulsen played for the Danish national team at the 2011, 2012, 2013, 2014, 2015, and 2016 World Championships.

Career statistics

Regular season and playoffs

International

References

External links
 

1988 births
Living people
Danish ice hockey forwards
Graz 99ers players
Herning Blue Fox players
IK Oskarshamn players
HC TWK Innsbruck players
Lahti Pelicans players
Nordsjælland Cobras players
People from Herning Municipality
Ice hockey players at the 2022 Winter Olympics
Olympic ice hockey players of Denmark
Sportspeople from the Central Denmark Region